Hamilton School (formerly Phoenix College) is a coeducational special school located in Reading, Berkshire, England.

The school has 64 places for 11–18 year olds. All students have statements of special educational needs relating to behavioural, social and emotional needs. The school was last inspected in 2019 and judged Inadequate.

Previously a community school administered by Reading Borough Council, in January 2020 Phoenix College converted to academy status and was renamed Hamilton School. The school is now sponsored by the Maiden Erlegh Trust.

References

Special schools in Reading, Berkshire
Academies in Reading, Berkshire
Special secondary schools in England